Tameka Jameson (born 11 August 1989) is a Nigerian sprinter. She competed in the 4 × 400 metres relay at the 2016 IAAF World Indoor Championships. She grew up in the United States before starting to compete for Nigeria.

Competition record

References

External links
 

1989 births
Living people
Place of birth missing (living people)
Nigerian female sprinters
American female sprinters
African-American female track and field athletes
21st-century African-American women
21st-century African-American sportspeople
20th-century African-American people
20th-century African-American women